is a Japanese] professional [baseball pitcher for the Chunichi Dragons of Nippon Professional Baseball (NPB).

Career
Kakikoshi is a graduate of Yamanashi Gakuin High School.

On October 25, 2018, Kakikoshi was selected as the 5th draft pick for the Chunichi Dragons at the 2018 NPB Draft and on 11 November signed a provisional contract with a ¥30,000,000 sign-on bonus and a ¥5,500,000 yearly salary. Upon signing his contract, Kakikoshi mentioned Masahiro Yamamoto and Daisuke Matsuzaka as players he would like to emulate.

As a middle-school student, Kakikoshi played for local club Hida Boys with Akira Neo with whom he was reunited by with the Dragons at the 2018 draft. 

On November 26, 2020, Kakikoshi re-signed with Dragons.

References

2000 births
Living people
Baseball people from Gifu Prefecture
Chunichi Dragons players
Japanese baseball players
Nippon Professional Baseball pitchers